Ubasi Khong Tayiji was a 17th-century Mongol prince. He was the first Altan Khan of Khalkha who ruled Khotgoids in northwestern Khalkha See Altan Khan of the Khotgoid.

 

17th-century Mongol rulers
1623 deaths
Year of birth unknown